Jesse L. Beauchamp (born 1942) is the Charles and Mary Ferkel Professor of Chemistry at the California Institute of Technology.

Early life and education 
 1964 B.S. California Institute of Technology
 1967 Ph.D. Harvard University

Research interests 
 Development of novel mass spectrometric techniques in biochemistry.

Awards 
In 1978 he received the ACS Award in Pure Chemistry from the American Chemical Society and in 1981 was elected to the National Academy of Sciences. In 1999 he received the Peter Debye Award in Physical Chemistry from the American Chemical Society and was again honored in 2003 with the Field and Franklin Award in Mass Spectrometry. In 2007 he received the Distinguished Contribution Award from the American Society for Mass Spectrometry for the original development and chemical applications of ion cyclotron resonance spectroscopy.

Former Students 
 Charles A. Wight - President of Weber State University
 Frances Houle (1979) - Director of JCAP North
 Terry B. McMahon (1974) - Professor or Chemistry at the University of Waterloo
 Peter B. Armentrout (1980) - Professor of chemistry at the University of Utah
 David Dearden (1989) - Chemistry and Biochemistry department chair at BYU
 Elaine Marzluff (1995) - Chemistry department chair at Grinnell College

References

External links
 Beauchamp Research Group at Caltech
 CCE website

21st-century American chemists
Mass spectrometrists
Living people
California Institute of Technology faculty
1942 births
Members of the United States National Academy of Sciences
Harvard University alumni
California Institute of Technology alumni